Initiated by Humberto Maturana in 1978 with the publication of his Biology of Cognition, his subsequent work in partnership with Francisco Varela in Santiago, Chile, eventually came to be called the Santiago theory of cognition. They and their work, their cohorts and like-minded intellectuals similarly came to be known as the Santiago school. The theory can be encapsulated in two sentences:Living systems are cognitive systems, and living as a process is a process of cognition. This statement is valid for all organisms, with or without a nervous system.This theory contributes a perspective that cognition is a process present at other organic levels.

The Santiago theory of cognition is a direct theoretical consequence of the theory of autopoiesis. Cognition is considered as the ability of adaptation in a certain environment. That definition is not as strange as it seems at first glance: for example, one is considered to have a good knowledge of Mathematics if they can understand and subsequently solve a Mathematical problem. That is, one can recognize the mathematical entities, their interrelations and the procedures used to view other aspects of the relevant phenomena; all these, are the domain of Mathematics. And one with knowledge of that domain, is one adapted to that domain, for they can tweak the problems, the entities and the procedures within the certain domain.

Cognition emerges as a consequence of continuous interaction between the system and its environment. The continuous interaction triggers bilateral perturbations; perturbations are considered problems – therefore the system uses its functional differentiation procedures to come up with a solution (if it doesn't have one handy already through its memory). Gradually the system becomes "adapted" to its environment – that is it can confront the perturbations so as to survive. The resulting complexity of living systems is cognition produced by the history of bilateral perturbations within the system/environment schema.

This theory contributes to the philosophical discussion of awareness, consciousness, cognition and the philosophy of mind.

See also
 Cognitive science
 Complex systems
 Fritjof Capra
 Heinz von Foerster
 Molecular cellular cognition
 Post-rationalist cognitive therapy
 Systems thinking
 Sustainability

References

External resources
Capra, Fritjof The Santiago Theory of Cognition. The immune system: our second brain. http://www.combusem.com/CAPRA4.HTM

Cognition